St Cadoc's Youth Club is a Scottish football club based in Newton Mearns, East Renfrewshire. They were formed in 1987 by David Jones, janitor at St Cadoc's Primary School and have grown into a large community sports club playing football and netball.

The club formed an adult side and successfully applied to join the newly founded West of Scotland Football League for the 2020–21 season. As part of the facility requirements for the league, they entered an agreement to groundshare with fellow West of Scotland League club St Anthony's at McKenna Park in Govan, Glasgow.

The club announced Craig McEwan as manager on 21 October 2020.

References

External links
Official website

Association football clubs established in 1987
1987 establishments in Scotland
West of Scotland Football League teams
Football in East Renfrewshire
Newton Mearns